"Desire" is a song by English synthpop band Years & Years from their debut studio album, Communion (2015). It was released on 23 November 2014 as the album's third single. Written by Years & Years and Kid Harpoon, the song peaked at number 22 on the UK Singles Chart.

Music video
A music video to accompany the release of "Desire" was first released onto YouTube on 4 November 2014 at a total length of three minutes and twenty-six seconds. The video features night scenes of the city of Tokyo with Olly seen writing the same word on a typewriter in a darkened room, scenes of Japanese people eating dinner, taking Paparazzi pictures, having sex, and the members recording the song in a blue foggy studio. At the end, Olly is seen in the darkened room with the typewriter with the entire room on fire.

Track listing
Digital download
"Desire" – 3:27

Digital download – Remixes
"Desire"  – 5:06
"Desire"  – 4:45
"Desire"  – 3:01
"Memo" – 3:22

7" vinyl
"Desire" – 3:25
"Memo" – 3:22

Digital download – Re-release
"Desire" (featuring Tove Lo) – 3:23

Digital download – Remixes
"Desire"  – 5:15
"Desire"  – 3:39
"Desire"  - 4:28

Charts and certifications

Weekly charts

Year-end charts

Certifications

Release history

Remix featuring Tove Lo

On 24 February 2016, the band announced a re-release of "Desire" via social media. They uploaded a short video containing clips from the new video and featuring a new backing track containing female vocals. The clip ended with the words "Desire March 4th" appearing on screen. On 2 March, the band announced Swedish singer Tove Lo would be featured on the new version. On 3 March, the band debuted the track on Capital FM Breakfast.

Music videos
At midnight on 4 March, the band released the new video via their Vevo channel on YouTube.

Charts

Release history

References

External links
 
 

2014 singles
2014 songs
Polydor Records singles
Songs written by Kid Harpoon
Songs written by Tove Lo
Tove Lo songs
Years & Years songs
Torch songs
Songs written by Olly Alexander
Song recordings produced by Mark Ralph (record producer)